Bjurtjärn socken is a former socken in Värmland, Sweden. It was established in 1630, when Karlskoga socken were split into two new entities. 

Since 1974, it has been part of the Storfors Municipality.

Its largest settlement, Kyrksten, has a population of about 300.

History 
The Bjurtjärn Church was built in the 17th century. Various items that is kept at this site were donated by the influential Linroth family.  

In 1854, more than 200 emigrants from Bjurtjärn settled in Pepin County, in the US state of Wisconsin.

Archeology 
The socken has various graves from the Iron Age.

Notable people 

 Clas Frietzcky, politician
 Hans von Kantzow, inventor and engineer

Sites of interest in Bjurtjärn socken 

 Alkvettern Manor

See also 

 Kerang
 Stockholm (town), Wisconsin

References 

Sockens in Sweden
Populated places in Storfors Municipality